Jewish Broadcasting Service is an American Jewish television network. JBS programming includes daily news reports from Israel, live event coverage and analysis, and cultural programming of interest to the North American Jewish community. The network is a full-time HD and SD channel. It is an English-language network produced by the non-profit organization Jewish Education in Media (JEM) (not to be confused with Jewish Educational Media, distributors of Chabad Lubavitch movement materials). The goal of this organization is to reach out to lesser affiliated Jews and bring them closer to their Jewish religion and Identity.

History
Shalom TV was developed by Rabbi Mark S. Golub in 2003, and began telecasting on August 31, 2006. In 2008, Comcast launched Shalom TV On Demand nationally. The On Demand version of Shalom TV expanded to more than 20 video distributors available to more than 40 million homes throughout North America.

In May 2012, Shalom TV became available as a Roku channel. On December 7, 2012, Optimum Cable (Cablevision) launched the Shalom TV Channel. Shalom TV was renamed JBS on September 24, 2014.

In September 2016, JBS became available nationally as a channel on DIRECTV channel 388. JBS launched in August 2017 on Verizon Fios in HD on channel 798. JBS HD launched on August 7, 2018 on Charter Spectrum in New York, California, Connecticut, Florida, Texas, Illinois, Missouri, and Ohio. JBS HD launched on December 8, 2020 on all Comcast Xfinity service areas.

Programming
Programs on JBS are intended to reflect the diversity and pluralism of the worldwide Jewish population. Programs include: 
 Daily news broadcast from Israel in English ILTV.TV. 
 Live late breaking stories and programs with viewer call-ins.
 Live Friday evening services. 
 Public affairs events
 American, Israeli, and Yiddish films
 Roundtable discussions of issues in the world Jewish community.
 Jewish Studies programs, including the teaching of Hebrew and commentary on basic tenets of Judaism.
 Children's programs.
 92nd Street Y presentations
 Israeli and American Jewish cultural shows
 Interviews with important Jews.
 Israel travel documentaries. 
 High Holiday services and original series.
 From Date to Mate, an original mockumentary series about the urban dating scene. 
 The Wisdom of Ruth Westheimer, an original television series featuring Ruth Westheimer (Dr. Ruth), sex therapist, media personality, professor, and author.

Availability

References

External links
 

Television networks in the United States
Jewish television networks
Jewish mass media in the United States
Television channels and stations established in 2006